The Major League Baseball postseason is an elimination tournament held after the conclusion of the Major League Baseball (MLB) regular season. Starting in 2022, the playoffs for each league—American and National—consist of two best-of-three wild-card playoffs contested by the worst-seeded division winner and the three wild card teams, two best-of-five Division Series (LDS) featuring the wild-card winners and the two highest-seeded division winners, and finally the best-of-seven League Championship Series (LCS). The winners of the American League Championship Series (ALCS) and the National League Championship Series (NLCS) play each other in the best-of-seven World Series. The current system allows for up to 53 postseason games and at least 32 games.

Format history

Before 1969: World Series only
Major League Baseball is the oldest of America's major professional sports organizations, steeped in tradition with roots dating back to the 1870s. The final series to determine its champion has been called the "World Series" (originally "World's Championship Series" and then "World's Series") as far back as the National League's contests with the American Association starting at the beginning of the 1880s.

From 1901 to 1968, the American and National League teams with the best win–loss records in their respective leagues would win their league's championship, or pennant. In 1903, modern annual postseason play began with a one-round system, in which the American League champion would play the National League champion in a best-of-seven series (in 1903, 1919, 1920, and 1921 it was best-of-nine) called the World Series; however, there was no 1904 Series because the National League champion New York Giants refused to play. This single-tiered approach persisted through 1968, even with the expansions of 1961–1962 that expanded both leagues to ten teams.

1969–1993: Two rounds
In 1969, both leagues expanded to twelve teams for a 24-team MLB, complicating the competition for league championship. Each team would play other clubs in its own region of the country more than clubs in the rest of the country, creating an unbalanced schedule that in some years could give a team from one region an advantage in fighting for the league pennant. To remedy this, and imitating the other major sports' long-standing playoff traditions, Major League Baseball split each league into East and West divisions, creating four divisions overall and no worse than a sixth-place finish for any team in any division until later expansions in 1977 and 1993. This created a new postseason round called the League Championship Series (LCS), in which the East and West division champions of each league would play a best-of-five series to determine the league champion. In 1985, the LCS was expanded to a best-of-seven series, which remains in place today.

Under this system, it was possible for one of the best teams in a league to be left out of the postseason if it failed to win its division. However, since both teams played in the National League West division, the Giants missed the postseason by a single game.

The baseball players' strike of 1981 uniquely—for this era—added another round to the postseason. Because the strike split the season into two roughly equal halves, MLB, as a one-off for that season only, had the division winners of each half of the 1981 season first meeting in a best-of-five Division Series. The winners of the division series then progressed to the league championship series, with the remainder of the postseason following a similar format to other years in this era.

1994–2011: Three rounds
Major League Baseball went through a realignment in 1994, when both the American and National Leagues expanded to three divisions: adding a Central Division in addition to the pre-existing West and East divisions. To avoid a playoff consisting solely of an odd number of divisional winners, the league added a wild card playoff spot to each league, imitating the original post-merger NFL system. The wild card berth was given to the team with the best record among the division runners-up. This assured that the team with the second-best record in its league qualified for the postseason even if that team hadn't won its division, avoiding cases such as the above-mentioned 1993 San Francisco Giants missing the playoffs by finishing second in the National League West division to the 1993 Atlanta Braves, even though the Giants had the second-best record in MLB. This new format doubled the postseason contenders in each league from two to four, and from four teams overall to eight.

The additional teams meant another elimination round was necessary. This new round would become the new first round of the postseason, the best-of-five Division Series. As mentioned above, this term had first been used for the extra round required in 1981 due to the "split-season" scheduling anomaly following the midseason baseball players strike; with this playoff expansion, the Division Series became permanent. This format was in place for the 1994 season, but that year's players' strike canceled the postseason. The format was realized on the field in 1995.

Under this format, in the two Division Series, the wild card team played the divisional champion outside its own division that had the better record, with the remaining two teams playing each other in the second Division Series for each league. The two Division Series winners from each league go on to play each other in the League Championship Series. As with the previous postseason format, the winners of each League Championship Series met in the World Series.

2012–2019; 2021: Expanded wild card
With the adoption of the new collective bargaining agreement in November 2011, baseball commissioner Bud Selig announced that a new playoff system would begin within two years; the change was ultimately put into place in 2012. The format chosen was the one-game wild-card playoff.

Under this format, a second wild card team has been added to each league, i.e., the team with the second-highest win total in each league among non-division winners. The two wild card teams play in a one-game playoff after the end of the regular season, with the winner advancing to the best-of-five Division Series. Just as in the previous format, the divisional champions qualify for the Division Series; however, under the expanded wild card format, the winner of the Wild Card Game faces the division winner with the best record in the Division Series, regardless of whether the two teams are in the same division, while the other two division winners play each other in the other Division Series, with the second-best ranked division winner having home-field advantage. The format for placement in the League Championship Series and World Series remains.

With this format, it is now possible for two teams in the same division to match up before the League Championship Series, provided that one team possesses the best record in its respective league.

2020: 16-team Wild Card Round
During the suspension of the 2020 MLB season due to the COVID-19 pandemic, all proposals put forward during negotiations between the MLB and Major League Baseball Players Association (MLBPA) included a temporarily expanded postseason. The various proposals included 16-team formats and included the 2020 and (in some proposals) 2021 seasons. However, the eventual lack of a negotiated season structure initially resulted in the 2020 season being intended to keep the 10-team format.

On July 23, 2020, MLBPA and the owners agreed to expand to a 16-team playoff structure for the 2020 season. The first round was called the Wild Card Series. The format consisted of eight teams from each league, seeded in the following order: division winners by record (1–3), runner-up teams by record (4–6), and the two best teams remaining (7–8). All games in this format were a best-of-three hosted by the higher seeds. All other series (LDS, LCS, and World Series) remained the same. The WCS pairings were as follows: top seed vs. eighth, second vs. seventh, third vs. sixth, and fourth vs. fifth. The DS had the 1/8 winner play the 4/5 winner, while the 2/7 winner played the 3/6 winner. This format was only used for that particular season as MLB reverted to the previous 10-team setup for the 2021 postseason.

2022–present: 12-team Wild Card Round
In the 2022 collective bargaining negotiations, owners and players agreed to a 12-team postseason, with six teams per league.

Seedings for the six teams are as follows:
 Division winners (1, 2, 3)
 Wild card teams (4, 5, 6)

This new postseason format was implemented starting with the  season. The top two division winners in each league will receive byes to the division series. The lowest-seeded division winner and three wild card teams, each seeded according to regular season record, will play a best-of-three Wild Card round, with the higher seed hosting all three games. The tie-breaker game (a.k.a. "Game 163") was also eliminated with playoff spots now determined through tie-breaker formulas.

The brackets remain fixed, with no re-seeding. In the Division Series, the 1 seed play the 4/5 winner, while the 2 seed plays the 3/6 winner.

Home-field advantage

World Series
The World Series used several different formats in its early years. Initially, it generally followed an alternating home-and-away pattern, except that if a seventh game was possible, its site was determined by coin toss prior to the sixth game. In 1924 the Series began using a 2-3-2 format, presumably to save on travel costs, a pattern that has continued to this day with the exception of a couple of the World War II years when wartime travel restrictions compelled a 3-4 format (used in 1943 and 1945, but not in the 1944 series, which was contested between crosstown rivals the St. Louis Browns and St. Louis Cardinals; all games were held in the same stadium in St. Louis). From the start of the 2-3-2 format through the 2002 season, home-field advantage generally alternated between leagues each year. Prior to the 1994 strike, the National League champion received home-field advantage in even-numbered years and the American League champion in odd-numbered years; these were reversed for 1995–2002 (because 1994 would have been the NL's turn to have home-field, but the World Series was canceled by the aforementioned strike). That changed starting in 2003.

The 2002 All-Star Game ended in a tie, much to the displeasure of both fans and sportswriters, who complained about a lack of intensity and competitiveness on the part of the players. This hit especially close to home for Commissioner Bud Selig, as the game had been played in his home city of Milwaukee, Wisconsin. In response, to make the game's outcome more meaningful, in 2003, MLB began assigning home-field advantage in the World Series to the winner of that year's All-Star Game, which is typically held in mid-July.

Following the acceptance of a new collective bargaining agreement after the 2016 season (which went into effect in 2017) home-field advantage in the World Series is no longer tied to the outcome of the All-Star Game, but instead is granted to the team with the better regular-season record. One exception was 2020, when all World Series games were played at a neutral site. The home-field advantage designation in the World Series was determined based on whichever pennant winner held the higher seed in its league, not necessarily the team with the better regular season record. However, in the event both pennant winners had held the same seeding number, only then regular season records would have determined the home team in Games 1, 2, 6, and 7.

League Championship Series
Until 1998, the LCS alternated home-field advantage with a 2–3 format in the best-of-5 era (1969–1984) and a 2–3–2 format when it went to best-of-7 (1985–present). Since 1998, the team with the better record has had home field advantage, but a wild card team never secures the extra home game, regardless of regular-season records, unless both teams in the League Championship Series are wild cards (starting in 2022).

Division Series
Until 1997, the Division Series rotated in which one of the three division-winning teams did not have home field-advantage, with the wild card team never having it. From 1998 to 2021, the two division winners with the best records in each league have home field while the least-winning division winner and wild-card team (the winner of the Wild Card Game) do not. Since 2022, the two division winners with the best records in each league have home field, while the two wild card winners don't have it. The Division Series used a 2–3 format until 1998 and now uses a 2–2–1 format. This is seen as a more fair distribution of home-field advantage because previously under the 2–3 format, the team hosting the first two games had absolutely no chance of winning the series at home. With the current 2–2–1 format however, both teams have the home-field advantage in a sense. While one team gets to host three games (including the critical first and last game), the other team does get two chances out of three (games 3 and 4) of winning the series on its home field.

With the adoption of the expanded playoff format in 2012, the five-game Division Series began with two home games for the lower seeds, followed by up to three home games for the higher seeds. This one-year change eliminated a travel day prior to a decisive Game 5 of a Division Series and was necessary because the 2012 regular-season schedule was announced before the agreement on the new postseason was reached. Since 2013, the Division Series restored the 2–2–1 format.

Wild Card Round 
Before 2012, the Wild Card team played the team with the best record that was not from their division. With the addition of a second Wild Card team, the Wild Card Game, a one-game playoff between the 4/5 seeds, was created. In this round, the 4-seed or the 1st Wild Card hosts the 5-seed or 2nd Wild Card, with the winner advancing to the next round of the playoffs to take on the best division winner in their respective league (regardless whether or not the teams are in the same division). This has caused some controversy in that some people want a three-game series to determine a winner instead of an elimination game to make the playoffs more fair. The 2020 implementation of the Wild Card Series had all three games hosted at the higher seed, to reduce travel and to reward regular season performance. The 2020 format was used again starting in 2022, but with the top two division winners receiving a bye to the Division Series, and the remaining four teams playing in this round. In this case, the third seed (lowest-seeded division winner) hosts the sixth seed (third Wild Card team), and the fourth seed (top Wild Card team) hosts the fifth seed (second Wild Card team).

Postseason bonuses
There are three factors that determine the actual amount of bonus money paid to any individual player: (1) the size of the bonus pool; (2) their team's success in the season/post-season; and (3) the share of the pool assigned to the individual player.

Bonus pool size

There is a separate pool for each series – the Wild Card games, the Division Series, the League Championship Series, and the World Series. The players' bonus pool is funded with 60% of the gate receipts for each of the Wild Card games, the first three games of each Division Series, the first four games of each LCS and the first four games of the World Series; limiting the funding for the pool to these games, the minimum number in each series, removes incentive to extend the series for merely fiscal sake. The value of the gate is determined by the size of the venues, the amount of high-priced premium seating in the venues, the number of games played in the series and whether the games sell out. Ticket prices for each series are set by MLB, not the home teams, so they are relatively uniform across baseball.

Awarding of bonus money

Since 2022, the World Series winner gets 36%, the World Series runner-up, 24%, two League Championship Series losers, 12% each, the four Division Series losers, 3.25% each, and the four Wild Card playoff losers 0.75% each. In 2020, the eight Wild Card Series losers got 0.375% each.

The division of the team's share of the pool is voted upon by the players who have been on the team during the entire regular season, in a meeting chaired by their union representative. This meeting follows the trade deadline on July 31. Players who have been with the team for the full season automatically receive a full share.  At the meeting, the full-season players vote on whether anyone else—including players who have not been with the team for the full season, coaches, and trainers—is to be granted a full share, less than a full share, a cash award, or no share.  After the World Series, the pool of money is split according to the shares determined in the vote. There is no limit to the number of shares that may be granted, but a greater number of shares dilutes the value of each share, and consequently the amount each player is awarded.

As an example, playoff-pool full-share holders for the St. Louis Cardinals received  each when the team won the World Series in 2006.

See also
Babe Ruth Award (best player in the postseason; since 2007)
"Esurance MLB Awards" Best Major Leaguer, Postseason
MLB division winners
Nippon Professional Baseball playoffs
Professional baseball

References

 
Annual events in Major League Baseball